José António Ramalho Lima (born 16 October 1966) is a Portuguese retired footballer who played as a forward.

Football career
Born in Mira Sintra, Lisbon, Lima emerged through Sporting Clube de Portugal's prolific youth ranks, but would never be more than a fringe player during his seven-season spell with the main squad. In 1988–89, he appeared in a career-best – for the Lions – 17 matches as the team could only rank fourth in the league; also during that year he gained his only two caps for the Portugal national football team, being definitely released in the 1992 summer.

After an unassuming year at Vitória de Guimarães, Lima moved to the lower leagues and joined Atlético Clube de Portugal. In 1997, at the age of 30, he joined another side in the Lisbon area, F.C. Alverca, helping S.L. Benfica's farm team to its first ever top level participation in the 1998–99 campaign, where the player featured rarely (six games), retiring shortly after.

Immediately afterwards Lima began working as a coach, first assisting José Romão then José Couceiro at his last club, Alverca. The following year, with the team in the second level, he was promoted to head coach but the club folded soon after.

Following a four-year spell with former side Sporting's juniors, Lima joined Carlos Carvalhal's coaching staff at the main squad in early November 2009, after Paulo Bento's sacking. In March 2011 he returned in the same predicament, under Couceiro.

See also
Football in Portugal
List of football clubs in Portugal

References

External links

1966 births
Living people
Portuguese footballers
Association football forwards
Primeira Liga players
Liga Portugal 2 players
Segunda Divisão players
Sporting CP footballers
Vitória S.C. players
Atlético Clube de Portugal players
F.C. Alverca players
Portugal youth international footballers
Portugal international footballers
Portuguese football managers
People from Sintra
Sportspeople from Lisbon District